Andrei Gabrielov is a mathematician who is a professor at Purdue University. He is a fellow of the American Mathematical Society since 2016, for "contributions to real algebraic and analytic geometry, and the theory of singularities, and for contributions to geophysics."

He obtained his Ph.D. from Moscow State University in 1973.

References

External links
Personal page at Purdue
Google Scholar Profile

20th-century Russian mathematicians
Year of birth missing (living people)
Living people
Purdue University faculty
Fellows of the American Mathematical Society
Moscow State University alumni